Nemocoris is a genus of true bugs belonging to the family Coreidae.

The species of this genus are found in Europe.

Species:
 Nemocoris fallenii Sahlberg, 1848

References

Coreidae